Yero is a name in various languages, used as a given name and a surname. Notable people with the name include:

Yéro Boly (born 1954), Burkinabé politician and diplomat
Elvis Yero (1964–2001), Cuban-American boxer 
Mukhtar Ramalan Yero (born 1968), Nigerian politician
Osvaldo Yero Montero (born 1969), Cuban artist
Yero Dia (born 1982), French footballer
Yinnela Yohan Yero Torres (born 1990), Panamanian beauty pageant contestant
Kalidou Yero (born 1991), Senegalese footballer